Streptomyces venetus is a bacterium species from the genus of Streptomyces which has been isolated from rhizosphereic soil of a palm (Elaeis guineensis).

See also 
 List of Streptomyces species

References 

venetus
Bacteria described in 2018